Julian Knowle and Igor Zelenay were the defending champions but only Zelenay chose to defend his title, partnering Denys Molchanov. Zelenay lost in the quarterfinals to Andre Begemann and Dustin Brown.

Santiago González and Wesley Koolhof won the title after defeating Sriram Balaji and Vishnu Vardhan 6–3, 6–3 in the final.

Seeds

Draw

References
 Main Draw

Sparkassen Open - Doubles
2018 Doubles